Heat shock factor protein 4 is a protein that in humans is encoded by the HSF4 gene.

Heat-shock transcription factors (HSFs) activate heat-shock response genes under conditions of heat or other stresses. HSF4 lacks the carboxyl-terminal hydrophobic repeat which is shared among all vertebrate HSFs and has been suggested to be involved in the negative regulation of DNA binding activity. Two alternatively spliced transcripts encoding distinct isoforms and possessing different transcriptional activity have been described.

See also
 Heat shock factor

References

Further reading

External links 
 

Transcription factors